Peace Burial At Sea are a Newcastle upon Tyne-based four-piece post-rock band which combine elements of post-hardcore with electronic textures, incorporating lyrical themes inspired by Soviet propaganda, horror films, science fiction, and the occult. Their name was inspired by J. M. W. Turner's 1842 painting of a similar name (below right).

The band originated in Hexham, Northumberland and released their debut album This Is Such A Quiet Town in 2003. A self-titled second album was released in 2006. A digital-only EP containing the album track "Czarina Catherine" was also released (date unknown), which included two other songs that do not appear elsewhere: "Easy Meat for Faceless Men" and "This is a Godless Town."

The band's early music was well-received, with reviews that included a rating of 'KKKK' from Kerrang! for their first album. Their second album was described by Drowned in Sound as "one of the undiscovered greats of its kind".

They played across the UK with such bands as 65daysofstatic and Hell is for Heroes, and also played shows in Moscow. Their music received national airplay on BBC Radio from DJs such as John Peel, Zane Lowe, and Steve Lamacq.

The band split up in 2007 and announced their last gig with characteristic self-deprecation: "We're first on, so get there early. We shall only be playing loud and fast songs, none of this prog nonsense."

In 2020, the band released two EPs containing two tracks each, titled A Slow Attack, Parts 1 and 2. It is the first new material in fourteen years with only a limited explanation given. This indicated that due to the COVID-19 pandemic, it was only right that the band should return. 

Both of the new EPs and the rest of the back catalogue are currently available via Bandcamp.

References

Musical groups from Newcastle upon Tyne
Electronicore musical groups
English metalcore musical groups
English post-rock groups
Electronica music groups
British post-hardcore musical groups
Musical groups established in 2003
Musical groups disestablished in 2007
Musical quartets